Just Dance Kids 2 is a video game for the Wii, PlayStation Move for PlayStation 3 and Kinect for Xbox 360, developed by Japanese studio Land Ho!, and is part of Ubisoft's Just Dance franchise. Just Dance Kids 2 is a dance-based music game with an emphasis on songs that are popular with children. The game was released on October 25, 2011 in North America, November 3, 2011 in Australia and November 4, 2011 in Europe (both under the title Just Dance Kids) and contains 40 songs.

Track listing

All the songs included in the game excluding those by The Wiggles, Yo Gabba Gabba!, David Choi, Tyler Van Der Berg, and Twirl are a special cover version for the game, not the original.

References

2011 video games
Just Dance (video game series)
Dance video games
Fitness games
Music video games
Ubisoft games
Wii games
Kinect games
Xbox 360 games
PlayStation 3 games
PlayStation Move-compatible games
Video games developed in Japan
Video games scored by Adam Gubman
Multiplayer and single-player video games